Ba Da Bing Records is an American record label based in Brooklyn, New York. The name is derived from the saying "ba da bing, ba da boom", common among Italian-Americans, especially in New Jersey.

The label was founded in Leonia, New Jersey in 1994 by Ben Goldberg. Goldberg ran the operation from a post office box while taking positions as a publicist for the independent labels Merge and Matador. In 2007, Goldberg moved the label's base to Brooklyn in the Fort Greene neighborhood.

One of the label's most successful acts is the group Beirut, whose debut album Ba Da Bing released in 2006.

Artists

 Arc Iris
 ÄSS
 Julie Byrne
 Ben Chatwin
 Colossal Yes
 Richard Conway-Jones
 Cousins
 Claire Cronin
 Cross Record
 Damon & Naomi
 The Dead C
 The Eagle Rock Gospel Singers
 Earth Jerks
 Eye
 Family Underground
 Jackson C. Frank
 Gate
 Jenn Grant
 A Handful of Dust
 Cassandra Jenkins
 Hamish Kilgour
 Hawthonn
 Wendy Eisenberg
 Peter Kolovos
 Lady Lamb
 La Morte Young
 Jenks Miller & Rose Cross, NC
 David Nance
 Natural Snow Buildings
 Ora Iso
 Our Love Will Destroy the World
 The Renderers
 Sarah Davachi 
 Slothrust
 Soft Landing
 Kane Strang
 Talk Talk/Mark Hollis
 The Terminals
 Threes and Will
 Tiny Ruins
 Katie Von Schleicher
 Richard Youngs
 warrior
 Woom
 youbet

Former

 1 Mile North
 Beirut
 Yume Bitsu
 Blek Ink
 Bright
 The Brunettes
 Patrick Cleandenim
 Comets on Fire
 Adrian Crowley
 Mark Dwinell
 Th' Faith Healers
 Alger Hiss
 Mark Hollis
 Essie Jain
 James Orr Complex
 Juneau
 Landing
 Mirza
 Monaural
 Jason Morphew
 Park Attack
 The Receptionists
 Xenia Rubinos
 Salteen
 Sharon Van Etten
 Shearwater
 Six Organs of Admittance
 Sons & Daughters
 The Spiny Anteaters
 Tune-Yards
 Ultrasound
 The Weak Moments
 Greg Weeks
 Benjamin Wetherill
 Devon Williams
 Windy & Carl
 Hawksley Workman
 Yours Truly

References

External links
Official website

American independent record labels